James Davis (c. 1575 in England – 16 February 1623(?), at James City, Virginia) was an English ship captain and author. He was part of the expedition of the  Virginia Company of Plymouth which established the short-lived Popham Colony, also called "Northern Virginia."

Popham Colony
Davis was master of the ship Mary & John which sailed to the New World to the coast of Maine. He is believed to be the author of an account of this voyage entitled, The Relation of a Voyage into New England begun from the Lizard, ye first of June, 1607. He was the commander of the fort built on the Kennebec River, August 19, 1607, by the Sagadahoc New England Colony (the colony was made up of knights and gentlemen from Bristol).

The short-lived colony built its fort and log buildings near present-day Phippsburg, Maine, in August 1607. The Virginia, a pinnace was also constructed to demonstrate shipbuilding potential of the new colony. When the Popham Colony closed in 1608 due to the severity of the winter, the Virginia was one of the vessels to carry the surviving colonists back to England, probably sailed by Davis.

Jamestown Colony
Records suggest that Davis and Virginia made at least one other Atlantic crossing, from England to the more successful Jamestown Settlement, a project of the Virginia Company of London. Virginia was apparently one of the two pinnaces in tow behind one of the larger ships of the Third Supply mission to Jamestown, which left Plymouth in 1609. They encountered a 3-day storm thought to have been a hurricane, resulting in the shipwreck of the flagship of the fleet, the Sea Venture, on Bermuda.

Virginia survived the storm, and under the command of Davis (accompanied by his wife Rachel), arrived in the Colony on 3 October 1609. A possible brother, Robert, migrated to Virginia with Davis as well. At that time, Davis assumed command of Fort Algernon at Point Comfort, where he survived the Starving Time of 1609-10. Davis was a councilor for the north Virginia Colony.

Virginia become a safe refuge when Indian hostilities erupted. She was also used to go inland to relieve Fort Algernon and attempt trade with the Powhatan confederacy. During this trip, Davis decapitated two Indians and left their mutilated bodies near the fort. On yet another inland foray, he destroyed a Powhatan village, burnt their corn and killed all men, women and children. Davis was soon in command of three forts.

Subsequent career
Mention of Davis continued. He is noted as commanding colonists at Henrico, Virginia in 1616. Most writers concur that Davis left his post in charge of the forts at Coxendale, near the present fort site of Henricus, and sailed for England aboard the ship "Treasurer", commanded by Samuel Argall in 1616. It is noteworthy that John Rolfe and Pocahontas were also aboard. And it is likely that he returned to Virginia in 1617 aboard the "George"; this is suggested by the fact that his son Thomas was deeded land in Virginia some years later for head rights accrued for two indentured servants whose passage he paid for on the 'George' that year.

Death
The date of Davis' death is uncertain. Some sources believe Davis was among those killed (or wounded) in the Indian Massacre of 1622 along the James River when 350 people (or one-third of the population) were killed. However, his name is not listed on official lists of the victims of the Virginia Company. Other records indicate that he died on February 16, 1623, at his plantation in Virginia. However, there are also others who believe that he may have lived as much as 10 years longer.

References

Sources
Biographies - James Davis (Wash &  NoVa Company)

External links
Maine's First Ship - a project to reconstruct Virginia
Popham Colony

Sea captains
English travel writers
Writers from the Thirteen Colonies
Virginia politicians
English emigrants
1570s births
1620s deaths

Year of birth uncertain
Year of death uncertain
People from Virginia
People of colonial Maine
17th-century English writers
17th-century English male writers
People of pre-statehood Maine
English male non-fiction writers